In Through the Out Door is the eighth and final studio album by the English rock band Led Zeppelin.  It was recorded in three weeks in November and December 1978 at ABBA's Polar Studios in Stockholm, Sweden, and released by Swan Song Records on 15 August 1979. Unlike earlier Led Zeppelin albums, In Through the Out Door was dominated musically by John Paul Jones. It was the band's last studio release before they disbanded in December 1980 after the death of their drummer John Bonham three months earlier.

Background
The album was named by the group to describe its struggles after the death of Robert Plant's son Karac in 1977, and the taxation exile the band took from the UK. The exile resulted in the band being unable to tour on British soil for over two years, and trying to get back into the public mind was therefore like "trying to get in through the 'out' door".

The group began rehearsing material in September 1978. After six weeks, they travelled to Polar Studios in Stockholm to begin recording. In contrast to previous Led Zeppelin albums, In Through the Out Door features much greater influence on the part of bassist and keyboardist John Paul Jones and vocalist Robert Plant, and relatively less from drummer John Bonham and guitarist Jimmy Page, who often failed to show up on time at the recording studio. Bonham was struggling with alcoholism and Page was battling heroin addiction. Jones later said, "there were two distinct camps by then, and we [Plant and I] were in the relatively clean one." Many of the songs were consequently put together by Plant and Jones during the day, with Page and Bonham adding their parts late at night. Jones was inspired by the Yamaha GX-1 synthesizer he had recently purchased, and he was "working closely with Robert, which was something that had not happened before".

After the recording sessions at Polar, the album was mixed at Page's personal studio at his home in Plumpton. "Wearing and Tearing", "Ozone Baby" and "Darlene"—the latter a boogie-woogie based song credited to all band members—were recorded during sessions for this album, but were dropped because of space constraints. All later appeared on Coda.

Songs
For In Through the Out Door, John Paul Jones is a co-writer on six of the seven songs, a larger share than on any other Led Zeppelin album. The album's "South Bound Saurez" and "All My Love" are the only two original Led Zeppelin songs that Page had no part in writing.

In Through the Out Door is the group's only studio album for which Bonham received no writing credits.

Side one
"In the Evening" was planned as the opening track for the album as "a full-blown epic", in order to show that Led Zeppelin could still make good music. In an interview, Page explained that he used a violin bow and a Gizmotron effect on his guitar to create the droning sound in the opening section of the song. The track features a contrast between the powerful riffs in the main part of the track, against a relatively quiet middle section.

"South Bound Saurez" starts with a "rollicking piano intro" played by Jones; author Dave Lewis calls it a "track that conjures up the New Orleans bar room feel of the sleeve." Credited to Jones and Robert Plant, it is one of only three officially released original songs by the band not to bear a Jimmy Page composition credit (along with this album's "All My Love", also credited to Jones and Plant, and "Bonzo's Montreux" from Coda, whose composition is credited only to John Bonham).

"Fool in the Rain" was an attempt to combine a samba rhythm with a basic rock tune, resulting in a polyrhythm part way through the song. The idea was inspired by Plant explaining that the group must explore new musical territory in order to remain current.

"Hot Dog" grew out of the band's pre-production rehearsals, where they warmed up by playing a series of old Elvis Presley and Ricky Nelson covers. Dave Lewis calls it a "rockabilly country hoe-down" that "owes much to the state of Texas and to the state of a particular female in Texas."

Side two
"Carouselambra" is a ten-minute track, dominated by Jones' keyboards and covering a variety of musical styles. Page played his Gibson EDS-1275 double neck guitar, which was normally only used for live performances. The group had intended to play the song live for the planned 1980 US tour, which was cancelled after Bonham's death.

"All My Love" is an unconventional love song composed by Plant and Jones when they were the first to arrive at the studio. It was written in honour of Plant's son Karac, who died while Led Zeppelin were on their 1977 North American tour. Jones played a classically inspired synthesizer solo in the middle of the track.

"I'm Gonna Crawl" is a relaxed blues track. Plant arranged the track to be in the style of mid-1960s soul music such as Wilson Pickett and Otis Redding. Jones contributed a string synthesizer arrangement.

Packaging and artwork
The original album featured an unusual gimmick: the album had an outer sleeve which was made to look like a plain brown paper bag (reminiscent of similarly packaged bootleg album sleeves with the title rubber-stamped on it), and the inner sleeve featured black and white line artwork which, if washed with water, would become permanently fully colored. There were also six different sleeves featuring a different pair of photos (one on each side), and the external brown paper sleeve meant that it was impossible for record buyers to tell which sleeve they were getting. The pictures all depicted the same scene in a bar (in which a man burns a Dear John letter), and each photo was taken from the separate point of view of someone who appeared in the other photos. The photo session in a London studio was meant to look like a re-creation of the Old Absinthe House, in New Orleans, Louisiana.

The album artwork was designed by Hipgnosis' Storm Thorgerson. In 1980, Hipgnosis was nominated for a Grammy Award in the category of Best Album Package for In Through the Out Door.

Release and promotion 
The album was intended to be released before the band's twin concerts at Knebworth in 1979, but production delays meant that it was released shortly after their performances at this event, on 15 August 1979. Plant jokingly referred to the delays at times during the performance on 4 August 1979.

The album reached No. 1 on the Billboard 200 in its second week on the album chart, reportedly selling 1.7 million copies within weeks of release. Subsequently, Led Zeppelin's entire catalogue appeared in the Billboard 200 between the weeks of 23 October and 3 November 1979, an unprecedented feat, topping their own record in 1975, when all their albums up to Physical Graffiti were on the chart. The album remained on the US top spot for seven weeks and sold three million copies by the end of September 1979. It was credited with helping to revive the US record industry, which had begun to struggle. In January 1980, "Fool in the Rain" was released as a single to further promote the album, but it narrowly missed the top 20 of the singles chart. It was the band's final studio release to reach the top of the charts in the United States.

In Through the Out Door is the Led Zeppelin album that has spent the most weeks on the top of the charts (tied with Led Zeppelin II). To date, the album has sold six million copies in the US.

Critical reception

In Through the Out Door divided contemporary critics and Led Zeppelin fans; some found its synthesizer-influenced music inevitable but forward-thinking while others felt the band had forsaken their heavy, fast sound. According to Jimmy Page biographer Martin Power, "predictably, in the wake of punk, In Through the Out Door received a rough ride from some critics, with Zep's veteran status in the music business now used as a stick with which to beat them."

Reviewing the album in Rolling Stone, Charles M. Young said Page's diminishing creativity resulted in little good material to work with for Plant, whose lyrics Young found inane, and Bonham, whose drumming was viewed as heavy handed. This brought to the forefront the keyboard playing of Jones, who Young said "functions best behind Page, not in front of him". Chris Bohn from Melody Maker said "the impressionable first play" of the record "had everyone in the office rolling around laughing", while accusing the band of being "totally out of touch" and "displaying the first intimations of mortality". By contrast, NME journalist Nick Kent argued that the album was "no epitaph", believing its "potential points of departure" deserved further listening. Robert Christgau also wrote positively of the record in The Village Voice, observing the usual "lax in the lyrics department", but regarding the album as the group's best since Houses of the Holy (1973). He said "the tuneful synthesizer pomp on side two confirms my long-held belief that this is a real good art-rock band", while "the lollapalooza hooks on the first side confirms the world's long-held belief that this is a real good hard rock band". At the end of the year, In Through the Out Door was nominated for the 1980 American Music Awards, in the category of "Favorite Pop/Rock Album".

Following the album's release, Plant, Page and Bonham all expressed reservations about the record. Plant later said that he enjoyed the variation in styles from previous albums, though he appreciated the album was "a bit sanitised". Page said in 2004, "we wanted, after In Through the Out Door, to make something hard-hitting and riff-based again. Of course, we never got to make that album." He is also quoted as saying, "It wasn't the most comfortable album. I think it was very transitional ... a springboard for what could have been." In Through the Out Door was Led Zeppelin's final album to be released while all the original members were still living. Drummer John Bonham died the next year on 25 September 1980.

In The Rolling Stone Album Guide (2004), Gaylord Fields said the album was "maligned upon its release a retreat from heaviness" but "now stands as an art-rock oddity with some alluring tangents". Colin Larkin appraised it in his Encyclopedia of Popular Music (2006) as "lacking the definition" of the band's previous records, yet "a strong collection on which John Paul Jones emerged as the unifying factor". Neil McCormick, however, reinforced past complaints about the album, ranking it as the band's worst album in a 2014 retrospective on the band in The Daily Telegraph: "Muddy production, perky synths, jaunty pop rhythms and an orchestral ballad make these songs barely recognisable as the heaviest band in history."

2015 reissue

A remastered version of In Through the Out Door, along with Presence and Coda were reissued on 31 July 2015. The reissue comes in six formats: a standard CD edition, a deluxe two-CD edition, a standard LP version, a deluxe two-LP version, a super deluxe two-CD plus two-LP version with a hardback book, and as high resolution 24-bit/96k digital downloads. The deluxe and super deluxe editions feature bonus material containing alternative takes and alternatively titled tracks, "Southbound Piano", "The Epic", "The Hook", and "Blot". The reissue was released with a black and white version of the original album's artwork as its bonus disc's cover. A replica of the brown bag and the colourable line drawing are included in this edition.

The reissue was met with generally positive reviews. At Metacritic, which assigns a normalised rating out of 100 to reviews from mainstream publications, the album received an average score of 73, based on eight reviews. Q magazine said "it's aged remarkably well and 'All My Love' is breathtakingly beautiful", while Tim Batcup from Classic Rock observed in the bonus material "a scruffier, rambunctious 'Hot Dog' and a sparser 'In the Evening', the drone intro truncated and Jones's synths high in the mix". PopMatters reviewer Andrew Doscas was more critical, especially of the bonus disc: "While In Through the Out Door does have some merit, it's cruel of Led Zeppelin to think that anyone, even a dedicated fan, could muster the strength to listen to the album twice in a row."

Track listing

Original release
The details are taken from the original US Swan Song album (UK edition does not list running times). All tracks written by John Paul Jones, Jimmy Page, and Robert Plant, except where noted.

 Sides one and two were combined as tracks 1–7 on CD reissues.

Deluxe edition (2015)

Personnel
Led Zeppelin
 John Bonhamdrums, percussion
 John Paul Jonesbass guitar, keyboards
 Jimmy Pageguitars, gizmotron, production
 Robert Plantvocals

Production
 John Davis – remastering (2015 reissues)
 Barry Diament – mastering (original 1988 Compact Disc release)
 Peter Grant – executive producer
 Hipgnosis – record sleeve
 George Marino – remastering (1994 reissues)
 Leif Mases – engineering
 Jeff Ocheltree – drum tech for John Bonham
 Lennart Östlund – assistant engineering

Charts

Weekly charts

Year-end charts

Certifications

References
Notes

Citations

Sources

External links

Images of the six covers 
Storm Thorgerson's official website – includes an In Through The Out Door feature
Rick Barrett In Through The Out Door Album Covers

1979 albums
Albums produced by Jimmy Page
Albums with cover art by Hipgnosis
Led Zeppelin albums
Swan Song Records albums
Albums recorded at Polar Studios